Leopard Cat Football Club, formerly known as Tatung Football Club, is a Taiwanese professional football club based in Taipei, that competes in the Taiwan Football Premier League. The club, affiliated with the electronics-producing Tatung Company, was founded in 1963 by a group of Tatung employees favoring football activities. They are among the first clubs to be owned by private enterprise on Taiwan.

History
The club has a long-standing rivalry with Taipower, as both are the most successful and most popular clubs in the country. In recent years, Leopard Cat has proved to be the dominant force on the island by winning the Taiwan Football Premier League three times in a row. In 2006 AFC President's Cup, Tatung reached the semifinals. In 2022, they announced a rebranding, following the consequences of Tatung Company's refusal from supporting the Tatung FC operations. They changed their name from Tatung FC to Leopard Cat, changed their crest, and their official colours, to avoid exclusion, or relegation of the Taiwan Football Premier League. After sufficient funds were raised to enable the team to play the next season in the TFPL, a realization of an election of 
supervisors and directors, and a general meeting successfully completed, Miao Boya was named the club's chairman.

Current squad

Technical staff

Continental record

Achievements as Tatung F.C.

Domestic
Taiwan Football Premier League
Champions (3): 2017, 2018, 2019
Intercity Football League 
Champions (2): 2007, 2013
Enterprise Football League
Champions (2): 2005, 2006
CTFA Cup
Champions (3): 1990, 1996, 2005
President's Cup
Champions (2): 1997, 1998
 Enterprise Football League is formerly known as National Men's First Division Football League.

Invitational
Peace Invitational Challenge Cup: 2006
World Chinese Cup Invitational Championship: 2005
Hawaii Challenge Cup: 2005

References

External links
Tatung at AFC President's Cup 2007 official site
Tatung official site
Tatung F.C. at Sofascore

Association football clubs established in 1963
Football clubs in Taiwan
Sport in Taipei
1963 establishments in Taiwan
Works association football clubs in Taiwan